Protonated ozone is a hydrogen polyoxide having the molecular formula  (also written ). It is a cationic structure consisting of an ozone unit with a hydrogen atom attached to one end. This substance is proposed to exist as an intermediate in several interstellar, atmospheric,and synthetic chemical processes. It has been synthesized in mass spectrometer experiments by protonation of ozone using various strong acids. Related experiments have used it as the precursor for generating hydrogen ozonide.

References 

Hydrogen compounds
Oxycations